Advance Mills, also known as Fray's Mill, is an unincorporated community in Albemarle County, Virginia.

It is a historic mill village dating from 1810.  The community was built by the Fray family, who moved there in 1833.  A historic district including its area was listed on the National Register of Historic Places in 2002.

The community first became known as "Advance Mills" in 1888, and the traditional story is that the name was coined by John Fray "who claimed that people frequently commented upon all the advances being made there."

At listing date, the district included a bridge, a dam, a millrace, and four houses.

The site of the mill and the site of a general store remain;  the mill itself and the supply store were destroyed by fire in the 1940s.

Significant contributing properties in the historic district include:
Advance Mills Bridge, crossing Rivanna River
Advance Mills Supply building site, lying below what is now the Advance Mills Store
Advance Mills General Store
J. M. Fray House, the best-preserved house in the district, c. 1810
Schoolhouse
Smokehouse
Bank barn
other outbuildings
the Gaines Fray House (II), from 1921, an American Four Square, just south of the store on west side of 743
Gaines Fray House (I)
A. G. Fray mill site
Bank Barn, 1/4 mile west of Rivanna River crossing
Ballard House, c.1900, an "I-house"

References

External links

Advance Mills Village Homeowners' Association webpage on history

National Register of Historic Places in Albemarle County, Virginia
Federal architecture in Virginia
Colonial Revival architecture in Virginia
Unincorporated communities in Virginia
Unincorporated communities in Albemarle County, Virginia
Historic districts on the National Register of Historic Places in Virginia